Barbara Kemp (12 December 1881 –17 April 1959) was a German soprano and opera singer. After a successful stage career, she retired to teach and also directed performances at the Berlin State Opera.

Life and career
Barbara Kemp was born in Cochem, Germany and studied singing at the Strasbourg Conservatory. She made her debut in Strasbourg in 1903 in the role of the priestess in Aida. She continued singing roles at local theaters and by 1913 she was employed at the Berlin Hofoper. She interpreted the role of Senta at the Bayreuth Festival in 1914 and performed at the Vienna State Opera from 1924-27. Her sister, Josefine Kemp, also had a successful operatic career.

Kemp married opera composer and Berlin State Opera director Max von Schillings in 1923, but continued her performing career. She sang at the Metropolitan Opera from 1922–24, making her debut in the leading role in her husband's opera Mona Lisa. The first run of Mona Lisa included five performances, which were also repeated the next year. Kemp also interpreted the roles of Kundry and Isolde at the Met.

Kemp retired from the stage in 1932, and afterward worked as a singing teacher and director at the Berlin State Opera, producing the opera Mona Lisa and Ingwelde. Recordings of Kemp include Der Rosenkavalier in 1927, and also a performance at the Berlin State Opera in 1928. She died in Berlin.

References

External links

1881 births
1959 deaths
German operatic sopranos
German music educators
People from Cochem
20th-century German  women opera singers
Women music educators